Ilya Serov (born November 8, 1986) is an American trumpeter and singer.

Ilya Serov is a Los Angeles-based jazz trumpet player and singer. Serov released his first album, September In The Rain, in December 2013. Serov was named Best New Artist at the Hollywood International Entertainment Awards in 2014.
Ilya Serov featured Roger Kellaway on an original rendition of Django Reinhardt's song "Swing 42" in 2017. On January 9, 2018, Ilya Serov released the single "Tangerine" that featured Grammy Award-winning Latin percussionist, Poncho Sanchez. Ilya Serov released his second album, Back In Time in September 2018 which featured Poncho Sanchez, Roger Kellaway, Bruce Forman and Eric Marienthal. In 2018, Serov performed on the Dave Koz and Friends at Sea Cruise, playing solo shows and appearing with musicians, such as Dave Koz, Michael Lington, Larry Graham and Jonathan Butler. Dave Koz invited Serov to rejoin the cruise in 2019 for ports in Australia.

References

External links
 

1986 births
American jazz singers
American jazz trumpeters
American male trumpeters
Living people
Russian emigrants to the United States
Singers from Saint Petersburg
21st-century trumpeters
21st-century American male singers
21st-century American singers
21st-century Russian male singers
21st-century Russian singers
American male jazz musicians